Margot Geertrui Gerritsen is a professor of Energy Resources Engineering at Stanford University and a senior associate dean for educational initiatives in the Stanford University School of Earth, Energy & Environmental Sciences. Her research interests include energy production, ocean dynamics, and sailboat design.

Gerritsen was born in the Netherlands. She earned a master's degree at Delft University of Technology. She completed her doctorate in 1996 in scientific computing and computational mathematics at Stanford, under the supervision of Joseph Oliger.  Between 1996-2001, she was a faculty member in the Department of Engineering Science in Auckland, New Zealand. Gerritsen then worked at the University of Auckland before rejoining Stanford as a faculty member in 2001.

She was named a SIAM Fellow in 2018.

References

Year of birth missing (living people)
Living people
Delft University of Technology alumni
Stanford University alumni
Academic staff of the University of Auckland
Stanford University faculty
Fellows of the Society for Industrial and Applied Mathematics
Dutch women engineers
21st-century women engineers